African Fashion Week Houston (AFWH) is an annual international fashion festival in Houston, Texas, that highlights African culture and aesthetics on the runway through a series of fashion shows, events, educational seminars, industry-focused workshops and special campaigns.

The week-long event, in 2014 by business and tech entrepreneur Nkem Oji-Alala, features designer collections that reflect the traditions of Africa and the diaspora.

References

2014 establishments in Texas
Fashion weeks